Hasso may refer to:

 Hasso von Boehmer (1904–1945), German soldier and part of the 20 July plot to assassinate Hitler
 Hasso Krull (born 1964), Estonian poet, literary and cultural critic, and translator
 Hasso von Manteuffel (1897–1978), German soldier and liberal politician
 Hasso Plattner (born 1944), cofounder of software giant SAP AG
 Hasso Spode (born 1951), German historian and sociologist
 Hasso von Wedel (general) (1898–1961), commander of the Wehrmacht Propaganda Troops during World War II
 Hasso von Wedel (aviator) (1893–1945), German World War I flying ace
 an old German given name Hasso (name)

German masculine given names